This is an incomplete list of people who served as Lord Lieutenant of Denbighshire in Wales. After 1733, all Lord Lieutenants were also Custos Rotulorum of Denbighshire. The office was abolished on 31 March 1974, being replaced by the Lord Lieutenant of Clwyd.

Lord Lieutenants of Denbighshire to 1974
See Lord Lieutenant of Wales before 1694''
Charles Talbot, 1st Duke of Shrewsbury, 31 May 1694 – 10 March 1696
Charles Gerard, 2nd Earl of Macclesfield, 10 March 1696 – 5 November 1701
William Stanley, 9th Earl of Derby, 18 June 1702 – 5 November 1702
Hugh Cholmondeley, 1st Earl of Cholmondeley, 2 December 1702 – 4 September 1713
Other Windsor, 2nd Earl of Plymouth, 4 September 1713 – 21 October 1714
Hugh Cholmondeley, 1st Earl of Cholmondeley, 21 October 1714 – 18 January 1725
George Cholmondeley, 2nd Earl of Cholmondeley, 7 April 1725 – 7 May 1733
Sir Robert Salusbury Cotton, 3rd Baronet, 21 June 1733 – 27 August 1748
Richard Myddelton, 20 August 1748 – March 1795
Vacant, March 1795 - 4 April 1796
Sir Watkin Williams-Wynn, 5th Baronet, 4 April 1796 – 6 January 1840
Robert Myddelton Biddulph, 8 February 1840 – 21 March 1872
William Cornwallis-West, 5 June 1872 – 4 July 1917
Lloyd Tyrell-Kenyon, 4th Baron Kenyon, 24 January 1918 – 30 November 1927
Sir Watkin Williams-Wynn, 9th Baronet, 23 February 1928 – 23 November 1951
John Charles Wynne-Finch, 21 November 1951 – 15 September 1966
Sir Owen Watkin Williams-Wynn, 10th Baronet, 15 September 1966 – 31 March 1974

Deputy lieutenants
A deputy lieutenant of Denbighshire is commissioned by the Lord Lieutenant of Denbighshire. Deputy lieutenants support the work of the lord-lieutenant. There can be several deputy lieutenants at any time, depending on the population of the county. Their appointment does not terminate with the changing of the lord-lieutenant, but they usually retire at age 75.

19th Century
1 February 1848: John Edward Madocks, Esq.
1 February 1848: John Price, Esq.
1 February 1848: Thomas Hughes of Ystrad, Esq.
31 July 1852: Captain Ebenezer Jones
3 August 1852: Major Sir William Lloyd, 
3 August 1852: Thomas Downward, Esq.
3 August 1852: James Maurice, Esq.
3 August 1852: Thomas Penson, Esq.

References

Sources
 
 

1974 disestablishments in Wales
Denbighshire